An Old Raincoat Won't Ever Let You Down is the debut solo studio album by Rod Stewart. First released in the United States in November 1969 as The Rod Stewart Album, the album peaked at No. 139 on the US Billboard 200 album chart. It was later released in the United Kingdom with the modified title in February 1970. Stewart's Faces bandmates Ronnie Wood and Ian McLagan also appear on the album, along with Keith Emerson, Jeff Beck Group drummer Micky Waller and guitarists Martin Pugh (of Steamhammer, and later Armageddon and 7th Order) and Martin Quittenton (also from Steamhammer).

Reception

The album received positive reviews from Fusion, Rolling Stone, and Robert Christgau. Christgau felt the album was "superb", the same wording as used by Greil Marcus in his Rolling Stone review.

In a retrospective summary for Rolling Stone, a staff writer felt that Stewart's solo debut showed him as a "highly original interpreter" of other people's songs, and that his own compositions indicated he was "capable of startlingly bare emotion and compassion".

Track listing

Personnel
Rod Stewart – vocals, guitars on "Man of Constant Sorrow"
Ronnie Wood – guitars, bass, harmonica on "Dirty Old Town"
Martin Pugh – guitars
Martin Quittenton – acoustic guitar
Ian McLagan – piano, organ
Micky Waller – drums

Additional personnel
Mike d'Abo – piano on "Handbags and Gladrags"
Lou Reizner – vocals on "I Wouldn't Ever Change a Thing"
Keith Emerson – organ on "I Wouldn't Ever Change a Thing"

Technical 
Keith "Marcus Keef" MacMillan – design, photography

Charts

Weekly charts

References

Rod Stewart albums
1969 debut albums
Mercury Records albums
Vertigo Records albums
Albums produced by Rod Stewart
Albums produced by Lou Reizner
Albums recorded at Olympic Sound Studios